Ian Fisher may refer to:

 Ian Fisher (English cricketer) (born 1976), English cricketer
 Ian Fisher (New Zealand cricketer) (born 1961), New Zealand cricketer
 Ian Fisher (journalist) (born 1965), American journalist
 Ian Fisher (physicist), British physicist